Proposition 65 was a California ballot proposition on the November 8, 2016 ballot that would have redirected money collected by grocery and certain other retail stores through mandated sale of carryout bags, and required stores to deposit bag sale proceeds into a special fund to support specified environmental projects.

Proposition 65 failed by a vote of 46%–54%.

The Progressive Bag Alliance, a plastic bag manufacturing trade group, backed Proposition 65, but opposed Proposition 67, a referendum on Senate Bill 270, which banned plastic shopping bags. With Proposition 67's passage, SB 270 was upheld and went into effect.

References 

2016 California ballot propositions
Plastics and the environment
Bags